The 1945–46 Illinois Fighting Illini men's basketball team represented the University of Illinois.

Regular season
The modern era of college basketball unofficially began with the 1945-46 season and the University of Illinois was quick to offer a team that was rebuilding its post-war image to that of a contender. Future hall of fame coaches Johnny Orr and Vic Bubas left the team to join in with the war effort as did Walt Kersulis, a top 5 scorer from the previous season and Consensus First-Team All-American and team captain Walt Kirk. The addition of freshman Bob Doster and Dwight Humphrey to a lineup that included team  Jack Burmaster, Robert Rowe and Walter Mroz became formidable opponents to every team they played including a no. 1 ranked DePaul.  On December 29, 1945, the Fighting Illini took on George Mikan's Blue Demons, who had lost just eight games in three years, and defeated them by a score of 56-37.  In the game Burmaster and Doster each scored 14 points with Mroz adding 11 in the second half. The victory proved that, even without team captain Kirk, who had gone to serve in the armed services, the young team was ready to take on all comers.  The 1945 Blue Demons went on to win the 1945 National Invitation Tournament. Additionally, the 1945-46 season would be the finale for the University of Chicago as part of the Big Ten.  Illinois would defeat the Maroons two times during the year, 70-28 and 85-24.  Due to the departure of Chicago, the Big Ten would become the Big Nine until Michigan State joined the conference in 1950.

Mills used 31 players during the course of the season and had an overall record of 14 wins and 7 losses with a conference mark of 7 and 5, finishing in a fifth place tie in the Big Ten.  The team finished with an 11 - 2 record at home and a road record of 3 - 5.  Future All-American Dwight "Dike" Eddleman would appear in two games during the course of the season, as well as future North Carolina A&T Aggies, hall-of-fame men's basketball coach, Cal Irvin, would appear in one game.

David "Matt" Bullock
1946 saw the end of a 34-year career for Illini athletic trainer Matt Bullock.  From 1913-47 David “Matt” Bullock saw to it that football and basketball stars like Red Grange, George Halas, Buddy Young, Ray Woods, Chuck Carney, Lou Boudreau, Andy Phillip and other Fighting Illini stayed healthy. During his long career at the University of Illinois, Bullock cared for more than 40,000 athletes.

Roster

Source

Schedule

|-
!colspan=12 style="background:#DF4E38; color:white;"| Non-Conference regular season

|- align="center" bgcolor=""

|-
!colspan=9 style="background:#DF4E38; color:#FFFFFF;"|Big Ten regular season

Bold Italic connotes conference game
												
Source

Player stats

Awards and honors
Jack Burmaster
Sporting News Honorable Mention All-American (1946)
Bob Doster
Sporting News Honorable Mention All-American (1946)
Team Most Valuable Player

References

Illinois Fighting Illini
Illinois Fighting Illini men's basketball seasons
Basketball, Illinois Fighting Illini Men
Basketball, Illinois Fighting Illini Men